Spice Crackers is the fifth studio album from German synthpop group Camouflage, released on September 11, 1995 by BMG.

Background
The band's new contract with BMG Germany provided them with full creative freedom, allowing the two to utilise works originally intended for their failed opera project and make them much more experimental, and sometimes even inspired by science fiction films. In March 1995 the band performed in Stuttgart and debuted the new material.

Overall, the album was a completely new venture for the group, and unfortunately was not a success. Due to this, the band went their separate ways.

Singles
Two singles were released from the record: "Bad News" in August 1995 and "X-Ray" in early 1996. Music videos were filmed for both. "X-Ray" was remixed by Tranceformer and Ronda Ray (alias Heiko Maile) for release. Both were included on the band's 2001 retrospective "Rewind".

Re-release
Due to the album being out of print, the band remastered and re-released the album in 2009. It features two discs, the second comprising B-sides and other rarities, some unreleased, from the Spice Crackers era. A download-only album was also released, containing all the remixes from the two singles.

Track listing

Personnel
Producer – Heiko Maile
Guitar, Keyboards – Ingo Ito
Remastered (2009 Edition) by – Sven Geiger
Vocals – Marcus Meyn

Credits
Arranged By – Heiko Maile, Ingo Ito, Marcus Meyn 
Art Direction, Photography By – Michel Moers 
Design, Graphics [Computergraphics] – Gisela Ludwig 
Lyrics By – Heiko Maile (tracks: 1 to 4, 7 to 14), Ingo Ito (tracks: 5, 14), Marcus Meyn (tracks: 1 to 4, 7 to 14) 
Music By – Heiko Maile (tracks: 1 to 4, 7 to 14), Ingo Ito (tracks: 1, 6, 14), Marcus Meyn (tracks: 1 to 4, 7 to 14) 
Producer – Heiko Maile 
Producer [Additional] – Ingo Ito, Stephan Fischer 
℗ 1995 BMG Ariola Hamburg GmbH

References

External links
Official discography

Camouflage (band) albums
1995 albums